In 1908 the Royal Württemberg State Railways placed an order with the Maschinenfabrik Esslingen for a powerful passenger tank locomotive. Classified as the Württemberg T 5, this superheated engine was designed for duties on Württemberg's main and branch lines and had the very long fixed wheelbase of 4,000 mm in order to give the locomotive smooth riding qualities. By 1920 a total of 96 engines had been manufactured. In 1919, three examples had to be give to France; the remaining 93 were taken over by the Deutsche Reichsbahn and 89 survived into the Deutsche Bundesbahn fleet. From 1959 they began to be retired. The last one was taken out of service in 1963 and was kept at Aulendorf as a museum engine until 1968. This last example was then scrapped as well.

The Württemberg T 5 proved itself very well and was occasionally even used to haul expresses on the Gäubahn between Immendingen and Stuttgart. No locomotives have been preserved.

See also
Royal Württemberg State Railways
List of Württemberg locomotives and railbuses

References

 
 
 

2-6-2T locomotives
T 5
Esslingen locomotives
Railway locomotives introduced in 1910
Standard gauge locomotives of Germany
1′C1′ h2t locomotives
Passenger locomotives